Jeffrey Michael Klauk (born November 28, 1977) is an American professional golfer who has played on the PGA Tour and the Web.com Tour.

Amateur career
Klauk was born in Boynton Beach, Florida. He played golf at Nease High School. He played collegiately at Florida Southern College where his team won the NCAA Division II Championship three times (1998–2000) and he won the individual title in 2000. He also played on the 2000 Palmer Cup team. He won the Southeastern Amateur in 1998 and 1999.

Professional career
Klauk turned professional in 2000. Since then he has primarily been on the second-tier Nationwide Tour, but in 2008 finished third on the money list to earn his 2009 PGA Tour card.

He has two professional wins on the Nationwide Tour. One came in 2003, at the Preferred Health Systems Wichita Open. The other came five years later in 2008 at the Melwood Prince George's County Open, which propelled him into the top 25 on the 2008 Nationwide Tour money list.

He had a successful rookie year on the PGA Tour and finished ranked 71st on the money list to retain his tour card.

Klauk's professional career has been marred by a history of injuries and epileptic seizures. In September 2012, after brain surgery, he made his first professional golf start for the first time in fourteen months at the Web.com Tour's Albertsons Boise Open. Klauk started 2013 with a "major medical extension" on the PGA Tour, however he failed to earn enough money ($578,937 in eight starts) to retain his card.

Personal
Klauk married Shanna Nagy, a fellow Florida Southern graduate. She won nine collegiate titles including the NCAA Division II Championship in 1996 and 1998.

Klauk has two children, Jackson and Bridget.

Amateur wins
1998 Southeastern Amateur
1999 Southeastern Amateur
2000 NCAA Division II Championship

Professional wins (2)

Nationwide Tour wins (2)

U.S. national team appearances
Amateur
Palmer Cup: 2000

See also
2008 Nationwide Tour graduates

References

External links

American male golfers
Florida Southern Moccasins men's golfers
PGA Tour golfers
Korn Ferry Tour graduates
Golfers from Florida
Sportspeople from Boynton Beach, Florida
People from St. Augustine, Florida
1977 births
Living people